The Ratonero Murciano is a breed of dog from the Spanish Region of Murcia. The Ratonero Murciano was traditionally kept in Murcia as a mouse and rat hunter, it is claimed they descend from dogs introduced to the region by the Romans who imported them from Egypt. In 1997 a breeding program was established to save the breed, by 2009 the program was up to its third generation, with 80 breeding specimens and a DNA testing program.
 
The Ratonero Murciano is described as a compact, short haired, active dog, well suited to its role as a rat hunter.

See also
 Dogs portal
 List of dog breeds

References

External links
Ratonero murciano video
 

 
Dog breeds originating in the Region of Murcia
Terriers
Rare dog breeds